Farhad Hasanzadeh (born 9 April 1962) is an Iranian author and poet known for his children's and adolescent literature.

Biography 
Hasanzadeh was born in Abadan, one of the southern cities of Iran, in 1962. The Iran–Iraq War (1980–88) displaced him from his birthplace, which was in the warzone. He worked a variety of jobs before becoming a writer. His first book, Fox and Bee Adventure, was published in 1991 in Shiraz. He later moved to Tehran.

Writing career
Hasanzadeh has published more than 100 books for children and young adults, including novels, short stories, legends, fantasy, humour, biography and poetry. He has also contributed to children's and young adults’ press, including "Soroosh Nojavan", "Soroosh Koodak", "Aftabgardan", "Keihan Bacheha". He has been a member of Children Writers Association and a member of the directing board. He had been working for Docharkheh, one of the most-circulated children magazines in Iran while it had been published, accompanying the Hamshahri newspaper.

Translated works
His works are widely read internationally. Translations of many of his works are available in many languages, including English, Swedish, Spanish, Arabic, Russian, Malay and Chinese. Call Me Ziba has been translated into four languages, while Kooti Kooti translated into  Chinese, English, Arabic, Turkish, Swedish and Malay languages. This Weblog is being Turned Over found its audiences within anglophone.  Hasti which raised flag about Iranian female Identity, was translated into English in 2013 and into Turkish in 2017.

Teaching

Hasanzadeh’s online writing workshops are designed to help teens develop their writing skills and practice the craft of storytelling. The workshops culminate in a monthly virtual publication called  Moon Children, where participants can showcase their work and share it with an audience. The publication features short stories, poems, articles, reviews, and other creative pieces created by Hasanzadeh’s pupils. Aspiring writers can use Moon Children as a platform for honing their skills and finding a community of writers with similar interests.

Themes
The Routledge Companion to International Children's Literature describes his work as "inclined towards a classic style" as opposed to postmodern. His writing often deals with the subject of war, and particularly its effect on civilians; it takes a pacifist, humanist stance. Other topics include migration, homelessness and life in shanty towns. His characters are sometimes marginalised, and he often addresses social taboos such as rape and sexual abuse, subjects rarely covered in other Persian novels. The Routledge Companion contrasts the feminist stance in his novel Hasti with typical Iranian children's literature.

Awards 
He has won many book awards, including several Iran's Book of the Year Awards. He was the Iranian nomination for the Astrid Lindgren Memorial Award in 2017, 2018, 2019, 2020 and 2023. Hasanzadeh was a runner-up in the Hans Christian Andersen Award in 2018 and finally received the diploma in the award ceremony in Athens, Greece. His novel Hasti has won several awards: winner in the Festival that teens judged, the Silver Sign award of the Flying Turtle Festival and the best book of the year on behalf of Children's Book Council. Hasanzadeh was among the top 6 writers selected for Hans Christian Andersen Award and brought its appreciation plate back to his home country of Iran. In June 2022, he was nominated to receive the 2023 Astrid Lindgern Memorial Award, party due to paying attention to the issues of society, such as girls and modern femininity in today's world, addressing universal human values ​​such as peace, friendship and children's rights, looking at war from different aspects  and also the environment.

Selected works 
 A Melody for Wednesdays, Tehran: Entesharat-e Rouzegar, 1398/2019
 Masho in Fog, Tehran: Nashr-e Sourehye Mehr, 1373/1994
 The Scorpions on the Bambek Ship, Tehran: Nashr-e Ofogh, 1395/2016
 The Moonlight Guest, Tehran: Nashr-e Ofogh, 1387/2008
 Wishing Stones, Illustrated by:Hoda Hadadi.Tehran:Entesharat-e Elmi Farhangi, 1385/2006
 Call Me Ziba, Tehran: Kanoon-e Parvaresh-e Fekri-ye Kudakan va Nowjavanan (Kanoon), 1394/2015
 Hasti, Tehran:Kanoon Publication, 1389/2010
 Shirin’s Times, Tehran: Vida, 1392/2013
 My Blog Is Up For Grabs, Tehran,Nashre Ofogh, 1391/2012
 The Same Purple Shoe, Tehran:Entesharat-e Kanoon, 1382/2003
 The Backyard, Tehran: Entesharat-e Ghoghnous, 1382/2003
 A Happy Family's Grins, Tehran:Entesharat-e Charkho falak, 1382/2003
 An Umbrella with White Butterflies, Tehran: Fatemi Publication, Tuti Books, 1396/ 2017.
 Kooti Kooti Tales, in Brail, by Kanoon, 1392/2013
 The Pot-headed Monster, e-book, Kanoon, 1389/2010
 Will & Nill, Chekkeh Publications, 1396/2017
Snow and Sun: The Story of Bijan & Manijeh, Tehran Fatemi Publications, Toti Books, 1398/2019 (Persian: برف و آفتاب: داستان بیژن و منیژه)
 Bang, Bang, Bang, Illustrated Children Story Book, Cheshmeh Publications, 1400/2021 (Persian: بنگ، بنگ، بنگ)
 First Things First, Illustrated Children Story Book, Fatemi Publications, 1401/2022 (Persian: یک کار خیلی مهم)

Some translated works (Published & Publishing) 

Halva and Rainbow Translated into Russian, Sadra book, 2022
Don’t Be Sad Zebra, Translated into Turkish, Republic of Azerbaijan, Tahsil Publications, 2022
Bang, Bang, Bang! Translated into Turkish, Republic of Azerbaijan, Tahsil Publications, 2022
An Umbrella with White Butterflies. Translated into Turkish, Republic of Azerbaijan, Tahsil Publications, 2022.
An Umbrella with White Butterflies. Translated into Chinese, China, CCPPG publishing house, 2022.
Ziba (Call me Ziba) Translated into Arabic, Egyptian Cultural Assembly, 2020
An Umbrella with White Butterflies, Translated into  Korean, South Korea. 2020
An Umbrella with White Butterflies, Translated into Spanish, Spain, lamaletaedicione, 2020
Dinner Was Cold Kooti Kooti, Translated into Turkish, Mevsimler Kitap, 2020
Kooti Kooti Watch out You Don’t Catch a Cold, Translated into Turkish, Mevsimler Kitap, 2020
Move the World Kooti Kooti, Translated into Turkish, Mevsimler Kitap, 2020
This Weblog Is Being Turned Over, Translated into English, Published in Internet Archive. USA. 2020
I Love You  Translated into Turkish, Children Library Azerbaycan, 2020 
Dinner Was Cold Kooti Kooti, Translated into Arabic, Syria,KiwanHouse, 2019
Call Me Ziba, Translated into Armenia, Edit Print Publishing House, 2019
Call Me Ziba, Translated into Turkish, Timas Yayinlar, 2017
Call Me Ziba, Translated into English. Tehran, Kanoon, 2016
Kooti Kooti Watch out You Don’t Catch a Cold, Translated into English, Tehran, Kanoon, 2016
Move the World Kooti Kooti,Translated into English, Tehran, Kanoon, 2016
Will and Nill,Translated into English, London, Tiny Owl Publishing Ltd, 2016
Hasti, Translated into English,Tehran, Kanoon, 2013
’’Hasti’’, Translated into Turkish, Children Library Azerbaycan,
Kooti Kooti, Translated into Malay, Malaysia, Ameeneducar, 2011 
The Kooti Kooti Tales, Translated into English, Tehran, Kanoon, 2010
The Pot-headed Monster, Translated into Kurdish, Kanoon, 2010
Dinner Got Cold, Kooti Kooti, Translated into Swedish, Rhyton Publications.
A Melody for Wednesdays Translated into Armenian, Geork Asatorian Publishing House.

References

Further reading 
 

1962 births
Iranian children's writers
20th-century Iranian poets
Living people
People from Abadan, Iran
21st-century Iranian poets